The 1920 Copa de Honor Municipalidad de Buenos Aires was the final that decided the champion of the 14th (and last) edition of this National cup of Argentina. In the match, held in Sportivo Barracas on January 30, 1921, Banfield won its first title in the top division after beating Boca Juniors 2–1.

Qualified teams

Overview 
The 1925 edition was contested by 16 clubs, 14 within Buenos Aires Province and 2 from Liga Rosarina de Football participating in the competition. Playing in a single-elimination tournament, Boca Juniors reached the final after eliminating Sportivo Barracas (3–0), Huracán (2–0), Almagro (2–0), and Newell's Old Boys (3–2 in semifinal).

On the other side, Banfield had been eliminated by Almagro (then beat by Boca) in playoff 1–0, but the disaffiliation of Lanús from the AFA caused the Association reprogrammed the competition. As a result, Banfield had a new chance, where the team beat Estudiantes de La Plata (unknown score), Sportivo Barracas (3–1), Porteño (4–0) and Tiro Federal (2–1 in semifinal).

The final was held in Sportivo Barracas Stadium on January 30, 1921. Boca Juniors's Marcelino Martínez scored the first goal on 23 minutes, but Banfield finally won the match with goals of Pambrún and López, achieveing its first title in the top division of Argentina.

Match details

References

m
m
1920 in Argentine football
Football in Buenos Aires